Pterostichus adoxus is a species of woodland ground beetle in the family Carabidae. It is found in North America. Larvae are predators.

References

Further reading

 

Pterostichus
Articles created by Qbugbot
Beetles described in 1823
Beetles of North America
Taxa named by Thomas Say